Tarawera is a former New Zealand parliamentary electorate, from 1978 to 1996. It was represented by two members of the National Party.

Population centres
The 1977 electoral redistribution was the most overtly political since the Representation Commission had been established through an amendment to the Representation Act in 1886, initiated by Muldoon's National Government. As part of the 1976 census, a large number of people failed to fill out an electoral re-registration card, and census staff had not been given the authority to insist on the card being completed. This had little practical effect for people on the general roll, but it transferred Māori to the general roll if the card was not handed in. Together with a northward shift of New Zealand's population, this resulted in five new electorates having to be created in the upper part of the North Island. The electoral redistribution was very disruptive, and 22 electorates were abolished, while 27 electorates were newly created (including Tarawera) or re-established.

History
In the 1978 election, the Tarawera electorate was won by Ian McLean. In 1996, the first mixed-member proportional (MMP) representation election, much of the electorate's area was included in the Rotorua electorate, and Bradford transferred to that electorate.

Members of Parliament
Key

Notes

References

Historical electorates of New Zealand
Bay of Plenty Region
1978 establishments in New Zealand
1996 disestablishments in New Zealand